Rob Standridge is an American business owner and politician currently representing District 15 in the Oklahoma Senate since his election in 2012.

Early life
He graduated from the University of Oklahoma in 1993 with a bachelor's degree in pharmacy. In 1995, he purchased a small pharmacy in Blanchard, Oklahoma and expanded the pharmacy into an interactive online pharmacy. In 2005, it was transformed into a pharmacy that specialized in juveniles and the mentally disabled.

Political career
For his 2012 campaign, Standridge won the runoff for the Republican primary against Jack Beller before facing Democrat Claudia Griffith. He received 18,789 votes, more than 60 percent of the vote, on November 6, 2012. Standridge was sworn in November 14, 2012. Standridge won reelection in 2016 against independent Shawn P. Sheehan and again in 2020 against Democrat Alex Scott.

On February 1, 2021, Standridge introduced Senate Bill 658, which would ban COVID-19 vaccine mandates in schools and was amended to also restrict school mask mandates; the bill passed both houses of Oklahoma's state legislature and was signed into law by Oklahoma's governor on May 28, 2021.

On December 16, 2021, Standridge introduced Senate Bill 1142, a bill that would prohibit schools from having or promoting books regarding sex, sexual identity, or sexual orientation. The bill would also allow for parents to request for the removal of certain books. If the book is not removed within thirty days, then the librarian must be fired and prohibited from working in a public school for two years. Parents are also awarded $10,000 every day the challenged book is not removed. Democratic representative Jacob Rosecrants argued that the bill effectively allowed for the removal of any book containing the word "sex".

On January 19, 2022, Standridge introduced Senate Bill 1381, a bill that would require homeless people to get permits for their camps. The camps would then have to continually meet health standards and building codes; if the camps fail to get a permit and comply with the codes, then the camps must be demolished by the city.

On January 20, 2022, Standridge introduced Senate Bill 1470 titled the "Students' Religious Belief Protection Act". The bill would allow for students to sue teachers for an upwards of $10,000 if they promote material that is held in opposition to the students' beliefs. The fine would be paid from the teacher's personal funds. If unable to pay, the teacher would be fired.

References

Republican Party Oklahoma state senators
Living people
University of Oklahoma alumni
People from Norman, Oklahoma
21st-century American politicians
American pharmacists
Year of birth missing (living people)